Rahul Verma is an Indian social activist and founder of the Uday Foundation, a non profit organization named after his son, who was born with multiple congenital defects. His work includes distribution of free food to poor patients and their caregivers outside hospitals and related to health and dignity of destitute in India.

Uday Foundation 

The Uday Foundation is a non-profit organisation based in New Delhi, India. The foundation works on health, support and dignity to homeless and disaster relief.

Activities 

The foundation supports homeless people with in-kind help, providing clothes, blankets, dry ration and dignity kits.   It helps disaster victims with  food, shelter, water, sanitation and emergency supplies for the victims.

It runs a free medical clinic for underprivileged patients, and provides medical help to critically ill children including storytelling sessions for children in hospital.

The foundation received the NGO Leadership & Excellence Awards 2015 by ABP News.

References

External links 

Social workers
Living people
Indian activists
Year of birth missing (living people)